Hasanović is a Bosnian surname derived from the Arabic name Hasan and means "son of Hasan". Notable people with the surname include:

 Ahmed Hasanović (born 2000), Bosnian footballer
 Eldar Hasanović (born 1990), Bosnian footballer
 Esad Hasanović (born 1985), Serbian cyclist
 Mirza Hasanović (born 1990), Bosnian footballer
 Nihad Hasanović (born 1974), Bosnian writer and translator

Bosnian surnames
Patronymic surnames
Surnames from given names